The A 27 road is an A-Grade trunk road in Sri Lanka. It connects Ampara with Maha Oya.

The A 27 passes through Uhana, Bakkiella, Nuwaragalatenna and Aranthalawa to reach Maha Oya.

References

Highways in Sri Lanka
Transport in Eastern Province, Sri Lanka